Steven Alexander Wright (born December 6, 1955) is an American stand-up comedian, actor, writer, and film producer. He is known for his distinctly lethargic voice and slow, deadpan delivery of ironic, philosophical and sometimes nonsensical jokes, paraprosdokians, non sequiturs, anti-humor, and one-liners with contrived situations.

Wright was ranked as the 15th Greatest Comedian by Rolling Stone in its 2017 list of the 50 Greatest Stand-up Comics. His accolades include the Academy Award for Best Live Action Short Film for starring in, writing, and producing the short film The Appointments of Dennis Jennings (1988) and two Primetime Emmy Awards nominations as a producer of Louie (2010–15). He is known for his supporting role as Leon in the Peabody Award–winning tragicomedy web series Horace and Pete.

Early life and career 
Wright was born at Mount Auburn Hospital in  Cambridge, Massachusetts, and grew up in Burlington, Massachusetts, one of four children of Lucille "Dolly" (née Lomano) and Alexander K. Wright. He was raised Catholic. His mother was Italian-American, and his father of Scottish descent. Wright's father worked as an electronics technician who "tested a lot of stuff" for NASA during the Apollo spacecraft program. When that program ended, he worked as a truck driver.

Wright attended Middlesex Community College in Bedford, Massachusetts, for two years to earn his associate degree, then continued his education at Emerson College. He graduated from Emerson in 1978 and began performing stand-up comedy the following year at the Comedy Connection in Boston. Wright cites comic George Carlin and director and former standup comic Woody Allen as comedic influences.

In 1982 executive producer of The Tonight Show Peter Lassally saw Wright performing on a bill with other local comics at the Ding Ho comedy club in Cambridge, a venue Wright described as "half Chinese restaurant and half comedy club. It was a pretty weird place." Lassally booked Wright on NBC's The Tonight Show Starring Johnny Carson, where the comic so impressed host Johnny Carson and the studio audience that less than a week later Wright was invited to appear on the show again.

Stand-up success 
Wright's 1985 comedy album I Have a Pony was released on Warner Bros. Records, received critical acclaim and was nominated for the Grammy Award for Best Comedy Album. The album's success landed him an HBO special, in the On Location: series, taped at Wolfgang's in San Francisco, as a live performance, for A Steven Wright Special. 

By then Wright had firmly developed a new brand of obscure, laid-back performing and was rapidly building a cultlike following and an onstage persona characterized by an aura of obscurity, with his penchant for non sequiturs and impassive, slow delivery adding to his mystique. The performance became one of HBO's longest-running and most requested comedy specials and propelled him to great success on the college-arena concert circuit.

In 1989, Wright and fellow producer Dean Parisot won an Academy Award for their 30-minute short film The Appointments of Dennis Jennings, directed by Parisot, written by Mike Armstrong and Wright, and starring Wright and Rowan Atkinson. Upon accepting the Oscar, Wright said, "We're really glad that we cut out the other sixty minutes." In 1992 Wright had a recurring role on the television sitcom Mad About You. He also supplied the voice of the radio DJ in writer-director Quentin Tarantino's film Reservoir Dogs that year. "Dean Parisot's wife Sally Menke is Quentin Tarantino's [film] editor, so when she was editing the movie and it was getting down toward the end where they didn't have the radio DJ yet, she thought of me and told Quentin and he liked the idea," Wright explained in 2009.

In 1995, Wright provided voiceover work for TBS's Disaster Area cartoon block.

Numerous lists of jokes attributed to Wright circulate on the Internet, sometimes of dubious origin. Wright has said, "Someone showed me a site, and half of it that said I wrote it, I didn't write. Recently, I saw one, and I didn't write any of it. What's disturbing is that with a few of these jokes, I wish I had thought of them. A giant amount of them, I'm embarrassed that people think I thought of them because some are really bad."

After his 1990 comedy special Wicker Chairs and Gravity, Wright continued to do stand-up performances, but was largely absent from television, doing only occasional guest spots on late-night talk shows. In 1999 he wrote and directed the 30-minute short One Soldier, saying it's "about a soldier who was in the Civil War, right after the war, with all these existentialist thoughts and wondering if there is a God and all that stuff."

In May 2000, Wright and other Ding Ho alumni, including Lenny Clarke, Barry Crimmins, Steve Sweeney, Bill Sohonage and Jimmy Tingle, appeared at a reunion benefit for comic Bob Lazarus, who was suffering from leukemia.

In 2006 Wright produced his first stand-up special in 16 years, Steven Wright: When the Leaves Blow Away, originally aired on Comedy Central on October 21, 2006. On September 25, 2007, Wright released his second album, I Still Have a Pony, a CD release of the material from When The Leaves Blow Away. It was nominated for the Grammy Award for Best Comedy Album.

Awards and honors 
Wright was awarded an Oscar in 1989 for Best Short Live-Action Film for The Appointments of Dennis Jennings, which he co-wrote (with Michael Armstrong) and starred in. He received two Emmy nominations as part of the producing team of Louie, first in 2014 and again in 2015.

On December 15, 2008, Wright became the first inductee to the Boston Comedy Hall of Fame.

In a 2005 poll to find The Comedian's Comedian, he was voted among the top 50 comedy acts by fellow comedians and comedy insiders. He was named No. 23 on Comedy Central's list of the 100 greatest stand-up comics.

Other interests 
While not well known for works outside of the comedy realm, Wright is a musician and has recorded several non-comedy songs with his friend and occasional actor Mark Wuerthner. He also has an interest in painting.

Beginning in 2008, Wright occasionally appeared on The Late Late Show with Craig Ferguson as a visiting celebrity, often dropping by to help with the fan-mail segment. He joined a small cadre of Hollywood comedy celebrities who supported the show.

Filmography

Film

Television

Discography

Albums

Specials

Appearances

References

External links 

 
 
 
 Wright-House.com: Jokes attributed to Steven Wright, with actual authors identified
 video clip of Steven Wright from When the Leaves Blow Away and interview - Dead-Frog.com
 

1955 births
20th-century American comedians
21st-century American comedians
20th-century American male actors
21st-century American male actors
American humorists
American male film actors
American male television actors
American male voice actors
American people of Italian descent
American people of Scottish descent
American stand-up comedians
Comedians from Massachusetts
Directors of Live Action Short Film Academy Award winners
Emerson College alumni
Living people
Male actors from Cambridge, Massachusetts 
Middlesex Community College (Massachusetts) alumni
People from Burlington, Massachusetts
Warner Records artists